Twist of Shadows is Xymox's third full-length album, released in 1989 on Wing Records (PolyGram) and produced by Peter Walsh (acclaimed producer of Simple Minds's New Gold Dream album).

The album captured Billboard's "Hot Shot Debut" honor and charted in the United States at #165 on the Billboard 200. Twist of Shadows launched several charting singles in the United States. In March 1989 "Obsession" shot up to #16 on Billboard's Alternative Songs chart. By June 1989 it had also reached #12 on Billboard's Hot Dance Club Songs (also known as Club Play Singles, and formerly known as Hot Dance Club Play). The second single, "Blind Hearts", reached #9 on the Dance Music/Club Play chart. The third single taken from the album, "Imagination" (with Anka Wolbert on lead vocals) reached #85 on Billboard Hot 100 and remains Xymox's biggest commercial success to date.

Background
Contrary to official songwriting credits (see Track listing below), lead singer and frontman Ronny Moorings told Premonition in a 2003 interview that he allegedly "always wrote the music and the words [him]self since the beginning of Clan Of Xymox in 1984". Pieter Nooten, who last contributed to Xymox with the next album, said differently in 2010 that the members of the band had from the start collaborated in songwriting, with Moorings contributing guitar, keyboards and lyrics; Nooten specifically claimed credit for composing Twist'''s "Clementina" although it is credited to Moorings and Wolbert.  Furthermore, the song bears striking resemblance to one of Nooten's other pieces, specifically a B-side "Promises" also released from this album. Also in 2010, Bert Barten claimed to have shared authorship for songs on Twist of Shadows, asserting "It was always a big grey area who wrote what and who inspired who. All the members even the manager at that time used to fight a lot about things like this." Anka Wolbert reflected in an interview in 2005: "The 'old' Xymox was always a combination and working together of three individuals: Ronny, Pieter Nooten, and myself. To me, Xymox was never one of them by themselves, and I consistently believed in the strength of the artistic combination of us three. There was a magical energy between us which resulted in some great music."

The album was recorded at Cobwebs Studio, Jacobs Studio and Ridge Farm Studio, and mixed at Comforts Place.  The string section was recorded at Tony Visconti's Good Earth Studios, now Dean Street Studios.

Reception
According to SPIN, Twist of Shadows signified the most sophisticated stage in the band's gradual evolution from arty obscurity into pop accessibility. Billboard claimed the album, along with the followup Phoenix (1991), had lifted the band to cult status in the United States. The album had mixed reviews. While SPIN praised the album and called it "still ethereal, big and foreboding", Trouser Press found the album "easily endurable" but labeled the band "just another lightweight electronic dance band of the post-romantic era".
Although Twist of Shadows wasn't exactly considered industrial in its sound, the bpm's run mid-tempo and sound made it totally danceable in a New Order-ish way. The Great Indie Discography found the album "decidedly dated...stuck in a mid-80s groove", while the St. Petersburg Times looked back at Twist of Shadows'' as "brilliant...[w]ith a dense, almost Gothic sound that borrowed as heavily from Pink Floyd as it did modern techno-popsters".

Track listing

Personnel
Xymox
Ronny Moorings – Vocals, Lyrics, Guitar, Keyboards
Anka Wolbert – Vocals, Lyrics, Keyboards, Bass
Pieter Nooten – Keyboards

Additional musicians
Will Anvers – Drums
Tony Visconti – Arranger, String arrangements (Track 07 and 10)
Arditti Quartet – Strings (Track 07 and 10)
Elisa Richard – Vocals (Background, Track 04)

Producers, Engineers
Peter Walsh – Producer, Engineer, Mixing, Vocals (Background)
Greg Walsh – Additional Production
Martyn Heyes – Assistant Engineer
Donal Hodgson – Assistant Engineer

Graphic Design
Vaughan Oliver – Graphic Design
Richard McMillan – Photomicrography

References

External links
Lyrics at official homepage

Clan of Xymox albums
1989 albums
Albums produced by Peter Walsh